The 12925 / 12926 Paschim Express is a Superfast Express train belonging to Indian Railways that runs between Bandra Terminus in Mumbai (Maharashtra) and Amritsar in Punjab.

It is a daily service. It operates as train number 12925 / 22925 from Bandra Terminus to Amritsar / Kalka and as train number 12926 / 22926 in the reverse direction.

Route & Halts
  
 
 
 
 
 
 
 
 
 
 
 
 
 
 
 
 
 
 
 
 
 '''

Traction
It is hauled by a Vadodara Loco Shed based WAP-7 locomotive from end to end.

References 

Transport in Mumbai
Transport in Amritsar
Railway services introduced in 1956
Named passenger trains of India
Rail transport in Punjab, India
Rail transport in Maharashtra
Express trains in India
Rail transport in Uttar Pradesh
Rail transport in Madhya Pradesh
Rail transport in Haryana
Rail transport in Rajasthan
Rail transport in Gujarat
Rail transport in Delhi
Rail transport in Chandigarh